Domnarvets Jernverk (Domnarvets ironworks), is a steelworks in Borlänge, Sweden. Since 1978 Domnarvet is a part of SSAB. The works was founded in 1872-78 and was originally a part of Stora Kopparbergs Bergslag.

External links
SSAB

Steel companies of Sweden